Sergiy Bezugliy (born October 7, 1984, in Mykolaiv) is a Ukrainian-born Azerbaijani sprint canoer. He competed internationally for Ukraine through 2008.

Career
In 2009, Bezugliy began representing Azerbaijan. He has won four medals at the ICF Canoe Sprint World Championships – two silvers (C-2 500: 2010, C-2 1000 m: 2009 for Azerbaijan) and two bronzes (C-2 500 m: 2009, C-2 1000 m: 2006 for Ukraine).

He finished eighth for Ukraine in the C-2 500 m event at the 2008 Summer Olympics in Beijing. At the London 2012 Summer Olympics, he competed in the men's canoe double 1000M (C2), finishing fourth in the final with a time of 3:37.219.

References

Canoe09.ca profile

Sports-reference.com profile (as Serhiy Bezuhliy)

1984 births
Azerbaijani male canoeists
Canoeists at the 2008 Summer Olympics
Canoeists at the 2012 Summer Olympics
Living people
Olympic canoeists of Ukraine
Olympic canoeists of Azerbaijan
Ukrainian male canoeists
ICF Canoe Sprint World Championships medalists in Canadian
Canoeists at the 2015 European Games
European Games competitors for Azerbaijan
Sportspeople from Mykolaiv